Thibault Ferasse (born 12 September 1994 in Saint-Brieuc) is a French former professional road cyclist, who competed as a professional from 2016 to 2022.

Major results

2016
 3rd Tour du Doubs
2017
 2nd Grand Prix des Marbriers
 6th Tour du Doubs
 6th Grand Prix de la Somme
 8th Tour du Finistère
 9th Grand Prix Cerami
 9th Grand Prix de Plumelec-Morbihan
2018
 1st  Mountains classification Tour de Bretagne
2019
 1st  Overall Boucles de la Mayenne
 10th Boucles de l'Aulne
 10th Classic Loire Atlantique
2021
 7th Tour de Vendée
2022
 3rd Paris–Camembert
 8th Vuelta a Murcia

References

External links

1994 births
Living people
French male cyclists
Sportspeople from Saint-Brieuc
Cyclists from Brittany
21st-century French people